Patel Brothers, Inc. (doing business as Patel Brothers) is an Indian-American supermarket chain based in Hanover Park, Illinois. Patel Brothers is the world’s largest supermarket chain serving the Indian diaspora, with 57 locations in 19 U.S. states—primarily located in the New Jersey/New York Metropolitan Area, due to its large Indian population, and with the East Windsor/Monroe Township, New Jersey location representing the world’s largest and busiest Indian grocery store outside India. Patel Brothers offers online shopping for the contiguous US through its website, which is fulfilled by its Hanover Park location. The chain was founded by brothers Mafat and Tulsi Patel and is operated by Mafat's sons, Swetal and Rakesh Patel.

History
Mafat lived in Bhandu, a small village in Gujarat along with his brother Tulsi before coming to Indiana University for an MBA in 1968. After finishing his business degree, he moved to Chicago to work as an engineer at Jefferson Electrical Co. Mafat found that Indian groceries were expensive and scarce in Chicago, which inspired him to start a grocery store. The first Patel Brothers store opened on Devon Street in 1974, and was operated jointly by Mafat, Tulsi and his wife Aruna, the latter two of which had immigrated from India to help with the store.

As of 2017, Patel Brothers has grown into a US$140 million chain of stores. As of 2022 on Devon Avenue in Chicago, where their first grocery store opened and remains, other shops are also part of the Patel Brothers chain: Air Tours Inc., a travel agency; Sahil, a clothing boutique meant for Indian weddings (another location in Iselin, NJ); and Annapurna Simply Vegetarian restaurant.  Their former Devon Avenue businesses that closed between 2017 and 2021 included Patel's Café; Mysore Woodlands restaurant; and Patel Bros. Handicrafts and Utensils, which sold religious memorabilia and trinkets.

Patel Brothers maintains its trademarks under PB Brands LLC, which include Dakshin, an Indian restaurant with locations in the Chicago suburbs of Schaumburg and Naperville, Illinois.

Patel Brothers is a family business. As of 2017, the retail chain's day-to-day operations are handled by Mafat's sons Swetal and Rakesh Patel, who also operate the Chicago warehouse in Skokie, Illinois. Mafat and Tulsi Patel still own the original store in Chicago and various trademarks. Tulsi Patel's daughter, Susan Patel owns Patel Bros. Handicrafts and Utensils in Chicago. Mafat's sister's sons Mahendra and Harshad operate the two New York warehouses in Queens. They have strongly built the company on the East Coast. Mafat's nephews Bharat and Jayesh  manage the stores in Indiana, Michigan, Ohio, and Texas.

Locations

Current locations

After starting out in Chicago, Patel Brothers was a major success with shoppers coming from all over the United States: Wisconsin, Minnesota, Indiana, Michigan, Iowa, and Kansas. The retail chain has spread throughout the United States, mainly the Eastern United States. As of April 2018, the chain had 55 locations, 8 in New Jersey (notably along Oak Tree Road in Edison and Iselin, which has three locations), 6 in Texas, 4 in New York, Florida, and Illinois each, and the rest are spread throughout the eastern United States with only two locations in the western United States: one store in Santa Clara near San Jose, California, and a second in Chandler, Arizona, near Phoenix. Patel Brothers are generally located in retail parks along with other stores and restaurants. As of 2022, the largest and busiest store is the ultramodern branch located in East Windsor, New Jersey, which includes an outdoor pani puri bar.

The locations in Iselin, New Jersey , New York east of the Garden State Parkway, Jersey City, New Jersey, North Brunswick, New Jersey and Ridgeland, Mississippi operate under the cash and carry concept. Several Patel Brothers locations including the McKinney, Texas; Naperville, Illinois; and Monroeville, Pennsylvania stores have green and yellow auto rickshaws near the store to maintain India's cultural identity in America. Some locations go by names other than Patel Brothers: the Ridgeland, Mississippi store operates under the name Patel Grocery and the Manchester, Connecticut store operates under the name Patel Foods. Patel Brothers is not affiliated with the gas station called Patel's Grocery in Homer, Georgia, Shah and Patel Indian Burmese grocery store in Rockville, Maryland, or Patel Foods Indo-Pak grocery store in Overland Park, Kansas. The reason why many Indian grocery stores have similar names to Patel Brothers is that PB Brands, LLC only has trademarks for the names Patel Brothers, Patel's, and Patel's Cash and Carry.

There are Patel Brothers locations on Devon Avenue's Desi Street in Chicago, 
Mahatma Gandhi District in Houston, India Square in Jersey City, New Jersey, and Patel Plaza (retail park leased by Patel Brothers) in Decatur, Georgia, where they are located in ethnic enclaves known as Little India, next to many other Indian restaurants and stores.

Former locations
Previously in Canada, Patel Brothers used to operate three stores in the Greater Toronto Area in Scarborough, Etobicoke, and Mississauga, which are now operated by Canada-based Panchvati Supermarket, and a store in Sugar Land in Greater Houston.

Brands and products

After Mafat and Tulsi Patel started their career as grocers they changed gears toward prepackaged ethnic foods. In 1991, they introduced a variety of authentic foods under the umbrella of Raja Foods LLC, which supplies for 60% of Patel Brothers products. Raja Foods LLC operates under seven brands, three of which are Patel Brothers original brands:

SWAD (Best Taste in Town) is an original Patel Brothers brand and is the main brand for Patel Brothers products. SWAD is the largest selling Indian food brand in the USA. Swad (स्वाद) is a Hindi word meaning taste. The main products of the SWAD brand are ghee, oil, lentils, beans, nuts, and spices.
Patel's Celebrating India is also a Patel Brothers original brand.
Anarkali is also a Patel Brothers original brand. 
Ching's Secret (DESI Chinese...Tasty Chinese)
Parle Products
Milhaas
Noorjehan
Raja Foods LLC has 5 warehouses:

Skokie, Illinois, the 60,000 square foot warehouse located in the Chicago metropolitan area, receives food products such as rice, spices, and mango juices from around the world including China, Australia, England, Spain, India, and Pakistan, which are then to distributed to local carriers such as Kmart, Whole Foods Market, Dominick's in Chicago (former),  Michael's Fresh Market in Naperville, Illinois (former), Indian ethnic stores, and various smaller carriers. The warehouse serves the Midwest and also has additional office space for Patel Brothers.
Queens: Two warehouses are located in Flushing and Maspeth, the latter serving both as a vegetable warehouse and now also serving as an operational base, located in New York City, serving the New York metropolitan area as well as the greater Northeastern and Mid-Atlantic U.S. regions.
Stone Mountain, Georgia located in the Atlanta metropolitan area, serves the Southeastern United States.
Houston, Texas, serves the Southwestern United States.
Patel Brothers sells South Asian cuisine including Indian, Pakistani, and Bangladeshi food products. Their products include beverages, canned and packaged goods, condiments, ghee and oil, grains, health and beauty products, instant mix, kitchen products, lentils and beans, ready to eat food, Indian snacks, South Asian sweets, spices, spice blends, and spiritual items.

Patel Brothers are also well known for its International Grocery Items, which sell in NYC and North Jersey to several restaurants serving international cuisines even during the pandemic.

Popular culture
In December 2017, Patel Brothers co-founder Mafat Patel was featured in Zee TV's Those Who Made It Season Finale.

References

External links
 Patel Brothers official website

Companies based in DuPage County, Illinois
Indian-American culture
Retail companies established in 1974
Supermarkets of the United States
Hanover Park, Illinois
1974 establishments in Illinois
Indian-American culture in Illinois